The QF 4.7 inch Gun Mark V originated as a  45-calibre naval gun designed by the Elswick Ordnance Company for export customers and known as the Pattern Y.

United Kingdom service
The Royal Navy did not adopt the gun, but several were adopted by the army as coast defence guns around the United Kingdom from 1900 onwards. In World War I the UK acquired 620  of a version manufactured in Japan, and mounted them as anti-submarine guns on merchant ships and troop ships, under the designation Mark V*. Many of these guns were used again in World War II on defensively armed merchant ships and troop ships.

Notable actions

On 10 March 1917 the crew of a single gun on the refrigerated cargo liner  fought a notable action against the heavily-armed German commerce raider . They managed to set the Möwe on fire and inflicted significant damage before the Otaki was sunk. Otaki's Master Archibald Bisset Smith went down with his ship and was posthumously awarded the Victoria Cross for refusing to surrender his ship.

See also
Type 3 120 mm 45 caliber naval gun version in service with the Imperial Japanese Navy from 1918
QF 4.7 inch Gun Mk I – IV 40-calibre version adopted by the Royal Navy
List of naval guns
Brixham Battery World War II Emergency Coastal Defence Battery using this gun

Notes

References

External links

Naval guns of the United Kingdom
120 mm artillery
Elswick Ordnance Company
Coastal artillery